There are several lakes named Mud Lake within the U.S. state of Iowa.

Clay County
Mud Lake is a lake on the Clay-Palo Alto County line. 

Mud Lake is a lake in southeastern corner of Clay County.  
Mud Lake State Wildlife Management Area is on this site.

Dubuque County
Mud Lake is a bay along the Mississippi River in Peru Township of Dubuque County. 
 It was a lake until Lock and Dam No. 11 flooded the banks of the river.  This former lake is part of the Upper Mississippi River Wildlife and Fish Refuge.

Linn County
Mud Lake is a lake in Monroe Township of Linn County.  
It is an Oxbow lake of the Cedar River.  The lake is within the Chain Lakes Game Management Area.

References
 USGS—U.S. Board on Geographic Names

Lakes of Iowa